The X Factor Israel is the Israeli version of the British television music competition The X Factor, created by Simon Cowell. The show started airing fall of 2013 on Reshet.

Judges and hosts
The first three seasons were hosted by Israeli fashion model Bar Refaeli.  hosts the fourth season. Its judges for the first season of the show were rock singer Rami Fortis, pop singer-songwriter and composer Moshe Peretz, pop and R&B singer Shiri Maimon, and pop singer Ivri Lider. In the third season, rapper Subliminal replaced Rami Fortis as a judge on the show. In the fourth season, all of the judging panel changes: Mizrahi singer Margalit Tzan'ani, singer-songwriter Aviv Geffen, singer and Eurovision 2018 winner Netta Barzilai, while a fourth and fifth judges revealed to be Ran Danker and Miri Mesika, making it the first season of X Factor Israel to feature 5 judges instead of 4.

Series overview
To date, three seasons have been broadcast, as summarised below.

 Contestant in (or mentor of) "Rami Fortis"
 Contestant in (or mentor of) "Shiri Maimon"
 Contestant in (or mentor of) "Ivri Lider"
 Contestant in (or mentor of) "Moshe Peretz"
 Contestant in (or mentor of) "Subliminal"
 Contestant in (or mentor of) "Ran Danker"
 Contestant in (or mentor of) "Aviv Geffen"
 Contestant in (or mentor of) "Netta"
 Contestant in (or mentor of) "Miri Mesika and Margol"

Judges' categories and their contestants
In each season, each judge is allocated a category to mentor and chooses a small number of acts (three for season one) to progress to the live shows. This table shows, for each season, which category each judge was allocated and which acts he or she put through to the live shows.

Key:

 – Winning judge/category. Winners are in bold, eliminated contestants in small font.

Season 1 (2013–14)

The first season started its run on Saturday, October 26, 2013, and aired during prime time on Reshet network on Wednesdays and Saturdays. The first episode peaked at 49%, about 1.1 million viewers, making it the highest figure of any Israeli music program. At the end of bootcamp, 20 contestants made it to the judges' houses. Two acts were eliminated from each judge before the live show. The top 12 finalists continued on for the live shows.

Season 2 (2015)

The second season started its run on Thursday, June 13, 2015.

Season 3 (2017–18)

The third season started its run on October 18, 2017. The show was hosted by Bar Refaeli and the judges were Moshe Peretz, Shiri Maimon and Ivri Lider, who had been judges in the previous two seasons; they were joined by a new judge, rapper Subliminal.

Season 4 (2021–22)

The show has been renewed for a fourth season and returned on October 30, 2021.  replaced Bar Refaeli as host.

Originally, Simon Cowell, Aviv Geffen, Margalit Tzan'ani, and Netta were to be judges for season 4. However, it has since been revealed that Cowell decided to pull out.
It was later decided that singers Ran Danker and Miri Mesika would both be judges in the show instead of Cowell, making it the first season of X Factor Israel to feature five judges instead of four.

See also
 Music of Israel
 Television in Israel

References

External links
 
 

Israel
Israeli reality television series
Channel 2 (Israeli TV channel) original programming
2013 Israeli television seasons
2013 Israeli television series debuts
Television series by Fremantle (company)
Israeli television series based on British television series
Eurovision Song Contest selection events
Music competitions in Israel
Channel 13 (Israel) original programming